The Life and Death of Colonel Blimp is a 1943 British romantic drama war film written, produced and directed by the British film making team of Michael Powell and Emeric Pressburger. It stars Roger Livesey, Deborah Kerr and Anton Walbrook. The title derives from the satirical Colonel Blimp comic strip by David Low, but the story itself is original. Some regard the film as the greatest British movie ever made and it is renowned for its sophistication and directorial brilliance as well as for its script, the performances of its large cast and for its pioneering Technicolor cinematography. Among its distinguished company of actors, particular praise has been reserved for Livesey, Walbrook, and Kerr.

Plot 
Major-General Clive Wynne-Candy (Roger Livesey) is a senior commander in the Home Guard during the Second World War. Before a training exercise, he is "captured" in a Turkish bath by soldiers led by Lieutenant "Spud" Wilson, who has struck pre-emptively. He ignores Candy's outraged protests that "War starts at midnight!" They scuffle and fall into a bathing pool.

An extended flashback  ensues.

Boer War
In 1902, Lieutenant Candy is on leave from the Boer War, where he has won the Victoria Cross. He receives a letter from Edith Hunter (Deborah Kerr), who is working in Berlin. She complains that a German named Kaunitz is spreading anti-British "propaganda" regarding the Second Boer War concentration camps, and she wants the British embassy to intervene. When Candy brings this to his superiors' attention, they refuse him permission to go to Berlin, but he goes anyway.

In Berlin, Candy and Edith go to a café, where he confronts Kaunitz. Provoked, Candy inadvertently insults the Imperial German Army officer corps. The Germans insist he fight a duel with an officer chosen by lot: Theo Kretschmar-Schuldorff (Anton Walbrook). Candy and Theo become friends while recuperating from their wounds in the same nursing home. Edith visits them regularly and, although it is implied that she has feelings for Clive, she becomes engaged to Theo. Candy is delighted, but soon realises that he loves her himself.

First World War
In November 1918 Candy, now a brigadier general, believes that the Allies won the First World War because "right is might". While in France, he meets nurse Barbara Wynne (Kerr again). She bears a striking resemblance to Edith. Back in England, he courts and marries her despite their twenty-year age difference.

In July 1919 Candy tracks Theo down at a prisoner of war camp in Derbyshire.  Candy greets him as if nothing has changed, but Theo snubs him.

On 26 August about to be repatriated to Germany, Theo apologises and accepts an invitation to Clive's house. He remains sceptical that his country will be treated fairly.

Barbara dies in August 1926, and Candy retires in 1935.

Second World War
In November 1939, Theo relates to a British Immigration official how he was estranged from his children when they became Nazis. Before the war, he refused to move to England when Edith wanted to; by the time he was ready, she had died. Candy vouches for Theo.

Candy reveals to Theo that he loved Edith and only realised it after it was too late. He admits that he never got over it. Theo meets Candy's MTC driver, Angela "Johnny" Cannon (Kerr again), personally chosen by the Englishman; Theo is struck by her resemblance to Barbara and Edith.

Candy, restored to the active list as a major-general, is to give a BBC radio talk regarding the retreat from Dunkirk. Candy plans to say he would rather lose the war than win it using the methods employed by the Nazis: his talk is cancelled. Theo urges his friend to accept the need to fight and win by whatever means are necessary, because the consequences of losing are so dire.

Candy is again retired, but, at Theo's and Angela's urging, turns his energy to the Home Guard - his efforts in building up that organisation win him national press attention. His house is bombed in the Blitz and replaced by an emergency water supply cistern. He moves to his club, where he relaxes in a Turkish bath before a training exercise he has arranged.

The brash young lieutenant who captures Candy is Angela's boyfriend, who used her to learn about Candy's plans and location. She tries to warn Candy, but is too late.

Theo and Angela find Candy sitting across the street from where his house stood. He recalls that after being given a severe dressing down by his superior for causing the diplomatic incident, he declined the man's invitation to dinner, and often regretted doing so. He tells Angela to invite her boyfriend to dine with him.

Years before, Clive promised Barbara that he would "never change" until his house was flooded and "this is a lake". Seeing the cistern, he realises that "here is the lake and I still haven't changed". Candy salutes the new guard as it passes by.

Cast 

Cast notes:
Making their second appearance in The Life and Death of Colonel Blimp were director Michael Powell's golden cocker spaniels, Erik and Spangle, who had previously appeared in Contraband (1940), and went on to be seen in the Powell and Pressburger films  I Know Where I'm Going! (1945) and A Matter of Life and Death (US: Stairway to Heaven, 1946).

Production 
According to the directors, the idea for the film did not come from the newspaper comic strip by David Low but from a scene cut from their previous film, One of Our Aircraft Is Missing (1942), in which an elderly member of the crew tells a younger one: "You don't know what it's like to be old." Powell has stated that the idea was actually suggested by David Lean (then an editor) who, when removing the scene from the film, mentioned that the premise of the conversation was worthy of a film in its own right.

Powell wanted Laurence Olivier (who had previously appeared in Powell and Pressburger's 49th Parallel and The Volunteer) to play Candy. However, the Ministry of Information refused to release Olivier—who was serving in the Fleet Air Arm—from active service, telling Powell and Pressburger, "...we advise you not to make it and you can't have Laurence Olivier because he's in the Fleet Air Arm and we're not going to release him to play your Colonel Blimp".

Powell wanted Wendy Hiller to play Kerr's parts but she pulled out due to pregnancy. The character of Frau von Kalteneck, a friend of Theo Kretschmar-Schuldorff, was played by Roger Livesey's wife  Ursula Jeans. Although they often appeared on stage together, this was their only appearance together in a film.

Further problems were caused by Prime Minister Winston Churchill, who, prompted by objections from James Grigg, his secretary of state for war, sent a memo suggesting the production be stopped. Grigg warned that the public's belief in the "Blimp conception of the Army officer" would be given "a new lease of life". After Ministry of Information and War Office officials had viewed a rough cut, objections were withdrawn in May 1943. Churchill's disapproval remained, however, and at his insistence an export ban, much exploited in advertising by the British distributors, remained in place until August of that year.

The film was shot in four months at Denham Film Studios and on location in and around London, and at Denton Hall in Yorkshire. Filming was made difficult by the wartime shortages and by Churchill's objections leading to a ban on the production crew having access to any military personnel or equipment. But they still managed to "find" quite a few Army vehicles and plenty of uniforms.

Michael Powell once said of The Life and Death of Colonel Blimp that it is 

At other times he also pointed out that the designer was German, and the leads included Austrian and Scottish actors.

The military advisor for the film was Lieutenant General Sir Douglas Brownrigg (1886–1946) whose own career was rather similar to Wynne-Candy's, as he had served with distinction in the First World War, was retired after Dunkirk and then took a senior role in the Home Guard.

Original release and contemporary reception 
The film was released in the UK in 1943. The première, organised by Lady Margaret Alexander, took place on 10 June at the Odeon cinema, Leicester Square, London, with all proceeds donated to the Odeon Services and Seamen's Fund. The film was heavily attacked on release mainly because of its sympathetic presentation of a German officer, albeit an anti-Nazi one, who is more down-to-earth and realistic than the central British character. Sympathetic German characters had previously appeared in the films of Powell and Pressburger, for example The Spy in Black and 49th Parallel, the latter of which was also made during the war.

The film provoked an extremist pamphlet, The Shame and Disgrace of Colonel Blimp, by "right-wing sociologists E. W. and M. M. Robson", members of the obscure Sidneyan Society, which proclaimed it "A highly elaborate, flashy, flabby and costly film, the most disgraceful production that has ever emanated from a British film studio."

The film was the third most popular movie at the British box office in 1943, after In Which We Serve and Casablanca.

Due to the British government's disapproval of the film, it was not released in the United States until 1945 and then in a modified form, in black and white as The Adventures of Colonel Blimp or simply Colonel Blimp. The original cut was 163 minutes. It was reduced to a 150-minute version, then later to 90 minutes for television, both in black and white. One of the crucial changes made to the shortened versions was the removal of the film's flashback structure.

Restorations
In 1983, the original cut was restored for a re-release, much to Emeric Pressburger's delight. Pressburger, as affirmed by his grandson Kevin Macdonald on a Carlton Region 2 DVD featurette, considered Blimp the best of his and Powell's works.

Nearly thirty years later, The Life and Death of Colonel Blimp underwent another restoration similar to that performed on The Red Shoes. The fundraising was spearheaded by Martin Scorsese and his long-time editor, Thelma Schoonmaker, also Michael Powell's widow. Restoration work was completed by the Academy Film Archive in association with the BFI, ITV Studios Global Entertainment Ltd. (the current copyright holders), and The Film Foundation, with funding provided by The Material World Charitable Foundation, the Louis B. Mayer Foundation, Cinema per Roma Foundation, and The Film Foundation.

The restored film was shown around the world.

Reputation and analysis 

Although the film is strongly pro-British, it is a satire on the British Army, especially its leadership. It suggests that Britain faced the option of following traditional notions of honourable warfare or to "fight dirty" in the face of such an evil enemy as Nazi Germany. There is also a certain similarity between Candy and Churchill, and some historians have suggested that Churchill may have wanted the production stopped because he had mistaken the film for a parody of himself (he had himself served in the Boer War and the First World War). Churchill's exact reasons remain unclear, but he was acting only on a description of the planned film from his staff, not on a viewing of the film itself.

Since the highly successful re-release of the film in the 1980s, The Life and Death of Colonel Blimp has been re-evaluated. The film is praised for its dazzling Technicolor cinematography, the performances by the lead actors as well as for transforming, in Roger Ebert's words, "a blustering, pigheaded caricature into one of the most loved of all movie characters". David Mamet has written: "My idea of perfection is Roger Livesey (my favorite actor) in The Life and Death of Colonel Blimp (my favorite film) about to fight Anton Walbrook (my other favorite actor)." Stephen Fry saw the film as addressing "what it means to be English", and praised it for the bravery of taking a "longer view of history" in 1943. Anthony Lane of The New Yorker said in 1995 that the film "may be the greatest English film ever made, not least because it looks so closely at the incurable condition of being English".

The film appears in Empire magazine's list of The 500 Greatest Movies of All Time at number 80.

See also
 BFI Top 100 British films

Notes

References

Bibliography

Chapman, James. "The Life and Death of Colonel Blimp: reconsidered". Historical Journal of Film, Radio and Television 03/95 15(1) pp. 19–36.
 Christie, Ian. "The Colonel Blimp File", Sight and Sound, 48. 1978
Includes the contents of Public Record Office file on the film
 Christie, Ian. The Life and Death of Colonel Blimp (script) by Michael Powell & Emeric Pressburger. London: Faber & Faber, 1994. .
Includes the contents of Public Record Office file on the film, memos to & from Churchill and the script showing the difference between the original and final versions
 Kennedy, A. L. The Life and Death of Colonel Blimp. London: BFI Film Classics, 1997. .
 Powell, Michael. A Life in Movies: An Autobiography. London: Heinemann, 1986. .
 Powell, Michael. Million Dollar Movie. London: Heinemann, 1992. .
 Vermilye, Jerry. The Great British Films. Secaucus, NJ: Citadel Press, 1978. pp66–68. .

External links 
 
 
 
 
 . Full synopsis and film stills (and clips viewable from UK libraries).
 BFI's Top Fifty (British) Films
 Blimp material at the Powell & Pressburger Appreciation Society
BBC Radio 4 programme on the film with contributions by Martin Scorsese, Thelma Schoonmaker, Kevin Macdonald, and Ian Christie.
 The Shame and Disgrace of Colonel Blimp
The Life and Death and Life of Colonel Blimp an essay by Molly Haskell at the Criterion Collection

DVD reviews
Region 2 UK – Carlton DVD
Various short reviews
TheCritic review

Region 2 France – Warner Home Vidéo / L'Institut Lumière
Review by John White at DVD Times (UK)

Region 1 USA – Criterion Collection
DVD Savant
Roger Ebert
DVD Journal

DVD comparisons
DVD Beaver comparison of Carlton & Criterion releases
Celtoslavica comparison of Carlton & Criterion releases

1943 films
1943 romantic drama films
1940s British films
1940s English-language films
1940s war drama films
British romantic drama films
British war drama films
Films about the British Army
Films by Powell and Pressburger
Films set in Berlin
Films set in England
Films set on the United Kingdom home front during World War I
Films shot at Denham Film Studios
War romance films
Western Front (World War I) films
World War II films made in wartime